These are the results of the women's time trial event in cycling at the 2004 Summer Olympics.  The race was held at 13:00 on 18 August. Zijlaard-Van Moorsel, who had crashed on the penultimate lap of the road race three days earlier, showed no serious damage had been done as she successfully defended her Olympic individual time trial title.

Medalists

Results

References

External links
Official Olympic Report

W
Cycling at the Summer Olympics – Women's individual time trial
2004 in women's road cycling
Vouliagmeni Olympic Centre events
Women's events at the 2004 Summer Olympics